Squallor (also spelled as Gli Squallor) were an Italian comedy music group, active between 1973 and 1994.

Career 
The group formed in  1973 as a ribald side project of four established musicians: composer and producer Giancarlo Bigazzi, producer Alfredo Cerruti, lyricist Daniele Pace and songwriter Totò Savio. Producer Elio Gariboldi left the band after the first album in 1973. Characterized by adult themes, references to sex, political incorrectness, and vulgarity, in spite of no live activity and radio ostracism, they got an immediate commercial success. In 1984 they wrote and starred in the low budget comedy Arrapaho, loosely inspired by their album with the same name, which was a surprise hit at the box office and achieved some cult status. The group disbanded in 1994, following their last album Cambiamento. 2012 saw the release of Gli Squallor, a documentary about the group.

The Squallor reached the crest of their popularity at the end of the 1980s. Federation of the Greens, Gianni De Michelis (in the song Demiculis) and Umberto Bossi (in Berta II) were some of their political and satyrical targets.

Discography  
Albums  
 
 1973 – Troia
 1974 – Palle
 1977 – Vacca
 1977 – Pompa 
 1978 – Cappelle
 1980 – Tromba 
 1981 – Mutando
 1982 – Scoraggiando 	 
 1983 – Arrapaho
 1984 – Uccelli d'Italia
 1985 – Tocca l'albicocca 	 
 1986 – Manzo 
 1988 – Cielo duro	 	
 1994 – Cambiamento

References

External links
 
 

Musical groups established in 1973
Italian comedy
1973 establishments in Italy
Musical groups disestablished in 1994
Comedy musical groups
1994 disestablishments in Italy
Italian musical groups
Musical groups from Milan